Nikolaos Karypidis (born 1947) is a Greek wrestler. He competed in the men's freestyle 63 kg at the 1968 Summer Olympics.

References

External links
 

1947 births
Living people
Greek male sport wrestlers
Olympic wrestlers of Greece
Wrestlers at the 1968 Summer Olympics
Place of birth missing (living people)